The 1943 Southwestern Pirates football team represented Southwestern University during the 1943 college football season. In Randolph M. Medley's fifth season at Southwestern, the Pirates compiled a 10–1–1 record, shut out six teams, and outscored their opponents by a total of 266 to 59. The Pirates defeated many notable teams during the season, including Texas in Austin, Rice in Houston, and New Mexico in the Sun Bowl, Southwestern's first bowl game. The Pirates tied their only ranked opponent, No. 13 Tulsa, and were themselves ranked. for the first and only season in program history, for a few weeks in October.

Schedule

References

Southwestern
Southwestern Pirates football seasons
Southwestern Pirates football